Gaoyi Ridge or Gaoyi Ridge Scenic Spot is a mountain ridge on the border of Suxian District, Chenzhou and Zixing in Hunan province, China.

Public access
Gaoyi Ridge Scenic Spot open to visitors for free.

Surrounding area
 Dongjiang Lake
 Fenghuang Island
 Flying Apsaras Mountain
 Banliang Ancient Village

Gallery

References

Mountains of Hunan
Suxian District
Zixing